The Rhacophorinae are a subfamily of frogs in the family Rhacophoridae. They range from tropical Africa and Asia to temperate China and Japan.

Genera
The following genera are recognised in the subfamily Rhacophorinae, representing 422 species:
 Beddomixalus Abraham, Pyron, Ansil, Zachariah, and Zachariah, 2013 (monotypic)
 Chirixalus Boulenger, 1893 (six species)
 Chiromantis Peters, 1854 (four species)
 Feihyla Frost, Grant, Faivovich, Bain, Haas, Haddad, de Sá, Channing, Wilkinson, Donnellan, Raxworthy, Campbell, Blotto, Moler, Drewes, Nussbaum, Lynch, Green, and Wheeler, 2006 (six species)
 Ghatixalus Biju, Roelants, and Bossuyt, 2008 (three species)
 Gracixalus  Delorme, Dubois, Grosjean, and Ohler, 2005 (18 species)
 Kurixalus Ye, Fei, and Dubois, 1999 (22 species)
 Leptomantis Peters, 1867 (13 species)
 Mercurana Abraham et al., 2013 (monotypic)
 Nasutixalus Jiang, Yan, Wang, and Che, 2016 (three species)
 Nyctixalus Boulenger, 1882 (three species)
 Philautus Gistel, 1848 (54 species)
 Polypedates Tschudi, 1838 (25 species)
 Pseudophilautus Laurent, 1943 (80 species)
 Raorchestes Biju, Shouche, Dubois, Dutta, and Bossuyt, 2010 (74 species)
 Rhacophorus Kuhl and Van Hasselt, 1822 (45 species)
 Rohanixalus Biju, Garg, Gokulakrishnan, Chandrakasan, Thammachoti, Ren, Gopika, Bisht, Hamidy, and Shouche, 2020 (eight species)
 Romerus Dubois, Ohler, and Pyron, 2021 (six species)
 Taruga Meegaskumbura, Meegaskumbura, Bowatte, Manamendra-Arachchi, Pethiyagoda, Hanken, and Schneider, 2010 (three species)
 Theloderma Tschudi, 1838 (28 species)
 Vampyrius Dubois, Ohler, and Pyron, 2021 (monotypic)
 Zhangixalus Li, Jiang, Ren, and Jiang, 2019 (40 species)

Phylogeny
The following phylogeny of Rhacophorinae is from Yu et al. (2008).

References

Rhacophoridae
Amphibian subfamilies